The National Security Adviser (NSA) is a senior official in the Cabinet Office, based in Whitehall, who serves as the principal adviser to the Prime Minister of the United Kingdom and Cabinet of the United Kingdom on all national security issues. The NSA post was created in May 2010 as part of the reforms that also saw the creation of the National Security Council. There have been six holders of the office to date, of whom two served more than three years in the post.

The NSA is Secretary to the National Security Council, which is chaired by the Prime Minister, and head of National Security and Intelligence (National Security Secretariat), which is, in turn, part of the Cabinet Office. The NSA will also advise Secretaries of State and other senior government ministers on issues of national security when necessary. The NSA was the Senior Responsible Officer for the Conflict, Stability and Security Fund, with a budget of over £1 billion. This role has been passed to the Deputy National Security Adviser.

The first National Security Adviser (NSA) of the United Kingdom was Sir Peter Ricketts, who was previously Permanent Secretary of the Foreign and Commonwealth Office and Chairman of the Joint Intelligence Committee. Ricketts was succeeded by Sir Kim Darroch in January 2012. On 7 July 2015, it was announced that Sir Mark Lyall Grant would replace Darroch as National Security Adviser in early September 2015.

It was announced in June 2020 that Mark Sedwill will step down from his role as NSA in September, and that current chief Brexit negotiator, David Frost, will serve as the NSA. A FOI answer however, states that Frost continues as Chief Negotiator to the EU as of October 2020 and David Quarrey took over the role of acting NSA provisionally. 

The NSA is supported by at least two Deputy National Security Advisers, and serves at the pleasure of the Prime Minister.

List of National Security Advisers
{| class="wikitable"
|+
!#
!Name
!Term start
!Term end
!Term length
!Prime Minister(s) served
!Ref
|-
|1
|Peter Ricketts (Lord Ricketts)
|12 May 2010
|23 January 2012
|
| rowspan="3" |David Cameron
|-
|2
|Kim Darroch (Lord Darroch)
|23 January 2012
|7 September 2015
|
|
|-
| rowspan="2" |3
| rowspan="2" |Sir Mark Lyall Grant
| rowspan="2" |7 September 2015
| rowspan="2" |13 April 2017
| rowspan="2" |
|-
| rowspan="2" |Theresa May
|
|-
| rowspan="2" |4
| rowspan="2" |Mark Sedwill (Lord Sedwill)
| rowspan="2" |13 April 2017
| rowspan="2" |16 September 2020
| rowspan="2" |
|-
| rowspan="3" |Boris Johnson
|
|-
| –
|David Quarrey (acting)
|17 September 2020
|25 March 2021
|
|
|-
|5
|Sir Stephen Lovegrove
|24 March 2021
|13 September 2022
|
|
|-
| rowspan="2" |6
| rowspan="2" |Sir Tim Barrow
| rowspan="2" |14 September 2022
| rowspan="2" | Incumbent
| rowspan="2" |
|Liz Truss
|
|-
|Rishi Sunak
|
|}

List of Deputy National Security Advisers 
There can be more than one DNSA at one time; some DNSA's are given specific titles referring to their specific remit.

 Julian Miller (2010–2015)
 Olly Robbins (2010–2014)
 Hugh Powell (2013–2016)
 Paddy McGuinness (2014–2018)
 Gwyn Jenkins (2015–2017)
 Christian Turner (2017–2019)
 Richard Moore (2018)
 Madeleine Alessandri (2018–2020)
 David Quarrey (2019–2022)
 Beth Sizeland (2020–2021)
 Alex Ellis (2020–2021)
 Andrew McCosh (2021–present) (Technology)
 Sarah MacIntosh (2022-present) (International Affairs)
 Matt Collins (2022-present) (Intelligence, Defence and Security)

References

External links
National Security and Intelligence

British Prime Minister's Office